Samea calligraphalis is a moth in the family Crambidae. It was described by Snellen in 1892. It is found in Indonesia (Java).

References

Spilomelinae
Moths described in 1892
Moths of Indonesia